Carlo Bovi (1576–1646) was a Roman Catholic prelate who served as Bishop of Sarsina (1635–1646) and Bishop of Bagnoregio (1622–1635).

Biography
Carlo Bovi was born in Bologna, Italy in 1576 and ordained a deacon in January 1622.
On 10 January 1622, he was appointed Bishop of Bagnoregio by Pope Gregory XV.
On 30 January 1622, he was consecrated bishop by Ludovico Ludovisi, Archbishop of Bologna, with Galeazzo Sanvitale, Archbishop Emeritus of Bari-Canosa, and Alfonso Gonzaga, Titular Archbishop of Rhodus, serving as co-consecrators.

On 29 January 1635, he was appointed by Pope Urban VIII as Bishop of Sarsina.
He served as Bishop of Sarsina until his death on 24 March 1646.

Episcopal succession
While bishop, he was the principal co-consecrator of:

References

External links and additional sources
 (for Chronology of Bishops) 
 (for Chronology of Bishops) 

ly

17th-century Italian Roman Catholic bishops
Bishops appointed by Pope Gregory XV
Bishops appointed by Pope Urban VIII
1576 births
1646 deaths